The Psychometric Society is an international nonprofit professional organization devoted to the advancement of quantitative measurement practices in psychology, education, and the social sciences. 
The society publishes a scientific journal called Psychometrika, concentrating on the area of statistics.

The society also conducts an annual scientific meeting.

Presidents
This is a list of past presidents of the Psychometric Society.

Louis Leon Thurstone
Edward Thorndike
J.P. Guilford
Truman L. Kelley
Karl J. Holzinger
Jack W. Dunlap
Paul Horst
Henry E. Garrett
Harold Gulliksen
Edward E. Cureton
Harold A. Edgerton
Irving Lorge
Phillip Justin Rulon
Dorothy Adkins
Quinn McNemar
John C. Flanagan
Robert L. Thorndike 1952-53
Lyle V. Jones 1962-63
Louis Guttman
Joseph Kruskal
Quinn McNemar
Ben J. Winer
Shizuhiko Nishisato
Fumiko Samejima
Frederick Mosteller
Jacqueline Meulman
David Thissen
Sophia Rabe-Hesketh
Alberto Maydeu-Olivares
Ulf Böckenholt
Bengt O. Muthén
Peter M. Bentler
Karl G. Jöreskog
R. Duncan Luce
Joseph Kruskal
Robert L. Thorndike

References

External links
 The Psychometric Society website

International professional associations
Statistical societies